The Flatbush Malls are a series of tree-lined landscaped medians along several roads in the Victorian Flatbush neighborhood of Brooklyn, New York City. An architecture critic has written that the malls "give the streets an uncommon spaciousness, if not grandeur". The first series was built in the northern part of the neighborhood along Albemarle Road, and extending one block north on Buckingham Road, in the Prospect Park South development of 1899, east of Coney Island Avenue and west of the BMT Brighton Line. This was modeled by the Scottish landscape architect John Aiken on Commonwealth Avenue Mall in Boston, with a design that originally included shrubbery but not trees, and in turn likely inspired the other neighborhood series. The second series, also known as the Midwood Malls, was built in the southern part of the neighborhood along both Glenwood Road, east of Coney Island Avenue and west of Delamere Place, as well as the intersecting East 17th Street, north of the Long Island Railroad cut of the Bay Ridge Branch and south of Foster Avenue, in the Fiske Terrace-Midwood Park developments of 1905.

Part of the malls extending to Flatbush Avenue on Glenwood Road were removed starting in 1932. Both series of malls feature cul-de-sacs on the Brighton Line, with the Glenwood Road series extending to both sides and also having one on the Long Island Railroad cut. All-way stops are installed on the Glenwood Road series, and another was added to the Albemarle Road series due to traffic safety concerns. There has also been concern about the watering of the malls. Both series of malls are owned by the New York City Department of Transportation but maintained by the New York City Department of Parks and Recreation as part of the Greenstreets partnership.

See also 

 Eastern Parkway
 Ocean Parkway
 Foothill Malls

References

Flatbush, Brooklyn
Parks in Brooklyn
Streets in Brooklyn
Traffic malls in New York City